"End of the Line" is a song by British girl group Honeyz. It was released as the group's second single on 7 December 1998 and reached number five on the UK Singles Chart, spending 16 weeks in the top 100 to become Honeyz' longest-charting single. It also reached number one on the UK R&B Chart and became the group's second top-40 hit in Australia, Iceland, Ireland, and Sweden. The single has sold 360,000 copies in the UK alone.

On 27 March 2015, the Official Charts Company inducted "End of the Line" into their Pop Gem Hall of Fame, which celebrates "overlooked classics and huge hits of yesteryear". The song was chosen as the "Ultimate Goodbye Song".

Versions
The song was remixed by Rude Boy, similarly to the album's third single "Love of a Lifetime," and this is the version included on both the single and album. The original mix remained unreleased commercially until 2006's The Collection album. A 4:30 promo edit of the original was later released on 14 May 2021 when all of the Honeyz original single releases were digitized for release on digital music stores and streaming services.

Composed by Australian songwriter Paul Begaud,

Track listings

UK CD1
 "End of the Line" (Rude Boy mix) – 4:58
 "Keep Me Hanging On" – 3:32
 "Don't Run Away" – 4:46

UK CD2
 "End of the Line" (Rude Boy mix) – 4:58
 "End of the Line" (Ignorants club mix) – 5:52
 "End of the Line" (Rude Boy mix edit) – 3:59
 "End of the Line" (video)

UK cassette single and European CD single
 "End of the Line" (Rude Boy mix) – 4:58
 "Keep Me Hanging On" – 3:32

Australian CD1
 "End of the Line" (Rude Boy mix) – 4:58
 "Keep Me Hanging On" – 3:32
 "Don't Run Away" – 4:46
 "End of the Line" (Ignorants club mix) – 5:52

Australian CD2
 "End of the Line" (Rude Boy mix) – 4:58
 "End of the Line" (Ignorants club mix) – 5:52
 "End of the Line" (Rude Boy mix edit) – 3:59
 "End of the Line" (Cas Roc mix) – 6:31
 "End of the Line" (Cas Roc instrumental) – 6:31
 "End of the Line" (enhanced video)

Charts and certifications

Weekly charts

Year-end charts

Certifications

References

1998 singles
1998 songs
First Avenue Records singles
Honeyz songs
Mercury Records singles
Song recordings produced by Steve Levine
Songs written by Paul Begaud